Adelpha serpa, the celerio sister, is a butterfly of the family Nymphalidae. It was described by Jean Baptiste Boisduval in 1836. It is found from Mexico to Brazil. The habitat consists of rainforests and cloudforests at elevations ranging from 300 to 2,000 meters.

The butterfly is 50–55 mm.

Larvae have been recorded feeding on Miconia multispicata, Conostegia subcrustulata, Sabicea species and Warszewiczia coccinea.

Subspecies
A. s. serpa (south-eastern Brazil to Paraguay, north-eastern Argentina)
A. s. celerio (Bates, 1864) (Guatemala, Mexico to north-western Venezuela)
A. s. diadochus Fruhstorfer, 1915 (Peru, Guyana, French Guiana, Brazil: Pará)
A. s. duiliae Fruhstorfer, 1913 (western Ecuador)

References

Butterflies described in 1836
Adelpha
Fauna of Brazil
Nymphalidae of South America
Taxa named by Jean Baptiste Boisduval